This is a list of the National Register of Historic Places listings in Oldham County, Texas

This is intended to be a complete list of properties listed on the National Register of Historic Places in Oldham County, Texas. There are 12 properties listed on the National Register in the county including one National Historic Landmark.

Current listings

The publicly disclosed locations of National Register properties may be seen in a mapping service provided.

|}

See also

National Register of Historic Places listings in Texas
Recorded Texas Historic Landmarks in Oldham County

References

External links

Registered Historic Places
Oldham County
Buildings and structures in Oldham County, Texas